"Joshua" is a 1963 jazz standard composed by the British jazz multi-instrumentalist  Victor Feldman and the jazz trumpeter Miles Davis. It was introduced in 1963 by the Miles Davis Quintet.

Renditions
Miles Davis – Seven Steps to Heaven (1963)
Miles Davis – Four & More (1964)
Dick Wellstood  – The Seldom Scene (1981)
Joe Henderson – So Near, So Far (Musings for Miles) (1992)
Wayne Henderson – Back to the Groove (1992)
Malachi Thompson – New Standards (1993)
Alan Dawson – Waltzin' with Flo (2002)
SF JAZZ Collective – Music of Miles Davis & Original Compositions (Live: SF JAZZ Center 2016) (2017)

References

See also

1963 songs
1960s jazz standards
Compositions by Miles Davis